Froleh is a road-side settlement in the Slovene Hills in the Municipality of Sveta Ana in northeastern Slovenia.

There is a small chapel in the settlement. It was built in the early 20th century by extending an existing older chapel and adding a small belfry.

References

External links 
Froleh on Geopedia

Populated places in the Municipality of Sveta Ana